The Bridge in West Earl Township, as it is designated on the National Register of Historic Places, is also known by its historic name, Big Conestoga Creek Bridge No. 12. It carries Farmersville Road (unsigned SR 1010) across the Conestoga River at Brownstown, West Earl Township, Lancaster County, Pennsylvania, in the United States. The bridge is notable for its form, a three-span, continuous, arched concrete girder that does not touch the abutments. Designer Frank H. Shaw was a consulting engineer to Lancaster County when the bridge was constructed in 1917, but appointed county engineer that same year.  The bridge was replaced with a new three-span structure in 2019.

See also
List of bridges documented by the Historic American Engineering Record in Pennsylvania
List of bridges on the National Register of Historic Places in Pennsylvania
List of crossings of the Conestoga River
National Register of Historic Places listings in Lancaster County, Pennsylvania

References

External links

Bridges completed in 1917
Road bridges on the National Register of Historic Places in Pennsylvania
Bridges over the Conestoga River
Bridges in Lancaster County, Pennsylvania
Historic American Engineering Record in Pennsylvania
National Register of Historic Places in Lancaster County, Pennsylvania
Concrete bridges in the United States
Cantilever bridges in the United States
Girder bridges in the United States